Eonian is a 2018 album by Norwegian black metal band Dimmu Borgir. 

Eonian may also refer to:
Eonian, pertaining to an eon or aeon
Eonians, followers of Éon de l'Étoile condemned by the Council of Reims in 1148
Eonians, ancient nation mentioned by Thucydides among Pelasgians
Eonian Records, label of Charlotte (American band)
"Eonian", single by Elisa (Japanese singer)